Ian Ralph Samwell (19 January 1937 – 13 March 2003) was an English musician, singer-songwriter and record producer. He is best known as the writer of Cliff Richard's debut single "Move It", and his association with the rock band America, with whom he had his biggest commercial success with their hit single, "A Horse with No Name". He also worked with rock bands, such as the Small Faces, The Grateful Dead, Frank Zappa, Joni Mitchell, John Mayall and Hummingbird.

Samwell wrote for many other British artists, including Joe Brown, Elkie Brooks, Kenny Lynch and Dusty Springfield. Several of his songs were recorded in Spanish by the Mexican group, Los Teen Tops and were released in Latin America and the Spanish-speaking territories of the world. He also worked as a record producer with Sounds Incorporated, Georgie Fame, John Mayall and the mod band The Small Faces, co-writing their 1965 hit single "Whatcha Gonna Do About It".

Career
In 1958, Samwell heard Harry Webb performing at the 2i's Coffee Bar in Soho. This led to his joining Webb's group as a guitarist. Shortly afterwards, the group was renamed Cliff Richard and The Drifters who later became Cliff Richard and The Shadows.
 
They signed a recording contract with EMI's Columbia Records and Samwell wrote "Move It", which was inspired by Chuck Berry. The song was initially intended as the B-side of their debut single "Schoolboy Crush", but Jack Good ensured that it became the A-side of their release. The song reached #2 in the UK Singles Chart and is generally accepted as the first rock and roll song to originate from the United Kingdom.

Samwell played rhythm guitar on "Move It", but was edged out of the band when Hank Marvin and Jet Harris joined. He was then offered a songwriting contract and wrote Richard's second hit single, "High Class Baby", and several other early songs for Richard, such as "Dynamite". In 1959, he wrote "Say You Love Me Too", which was recorded by The Isley Brothers and thus became the first song by a British songwriter to be recorded by an American R&B act.

In the summer of 1961, Samwell hosted some lunchtime record dance sessions at the Lyceum Ballroom in London, using his own collection of R&B and country rock records. Then in August, he was appointed first resident DJ on Sunday and Tuesday sessions, playing in front of a fast-growing audience of a couple of thousand, mainly made up of fans of the new, mod scene. Later, music historian Dave Godin stated that: "In some ways, the Lyceum was the first place that could merit the name discothèque". He was also a Disc Jockey at The Orchid Ballroom Purley, after the Lyceum.

He went on to work with other artists, as a staff producer at Warner Bros. Records in London. Samwell discovered the band America and produced their first album, America in 1972. Samwell is also credited with persuading their guitarist Dewey Bunnell to change the name of "Desert Song" to "A Horse with No Name", which became an international chart success. In 1974, Samwell produced the first of three albums he worked on with Hummingbird whose line-up included Bobby Tench and other former members of The second Jeff Beck Group.

Death
Samwell underwent a heart transplant in the 1990s and died in Sacramento, California on 13 March 2003, aged sixty-six. Shortly before his death, he had been active in the Sacramento, California music scene, working closely with several local acts. His sons, Ralph Lewis Samwell and Tyson Haynes, both live in London.

References

English record producers
English songwriters
People from Lambeth
1937 births
2003 deaths
The Shadows members